This was the first edition of the tournament.

Anna Blinkova and Oksana Kalashnikova won the title, defeating Usue Maitane Arconada and Jamie Loeb in the final, 6–2, 4–6, [10–4].

Seeds

Draw

Draw

References
Main Draw

Oracle Challenger Series – New Haven - Doubles